Alfonso Alberto Perla Fuentes (born 28 March 1982) is a Salvadoran professional football player, who most recently played for Vista Hermosa in the Primera División de Fútbol de El Salvador.

Club career
Nicknamed el Ogro, Perla began his playing career with Dragón in 2003, before joining Águila for the 2005 Clausura. He had played for Vista Hermosa since 2005, but was put on the transfer list due to financial circumstances in June 2011 despite his contract still running for two years.

See also
Football in El Salvador
List of football clubs in El Salvador

References

External links

1982 births
Living people
People from La Unión Department
Salvadoran footballers
C.D. Águila footballers
C.D. Vista Hermosa footballers
Association football midfielders